Federico Gaio was the defending champion but lost in the second round to João Souza.

Filip Krajinović won the title after defeating Salvatore Caruso 6–3, 6–2 in the final.

Seeds

Draw

Finals

Top half

Bottom half

References
Main Draw
Qualifying Draw

Thindown Challenger Biella - Singles
Tennis tournaments in Italy